Inspiration porn is the portrayal of people with disabilities (or other uncommon life circumstances) as being inspirational to able-bodied people (or other common reference group), on the basis of their life circumstances. The term "inspiration porn" is by analogy with pornography, in that the material is perceived as objectifying disabled people for the benefit or gratification of the able-bodied. Inspiration porn is a form of ableism. An example of inspiration porn might be photo of a child with a disability taking part in an ordinary activity, with captions targeted towards able-bodied people such as "your excuse is invalid", "before you quit, try" or "they didn't let their disability stop them".

Origin 

The term was coined in 2012 by disability rights activist Stella Young in an editorial in Australian Broadcasting Corporation's webzine Ramp Up and further explored in her TEDx Talk. About her decisions in naming inspiration porn, Young stated: "I use the term porn deliberately because of the objectification of one group of people for the benefit of another group of people." She rejected the idea that disabled people's otherwise ordinary activities should be considered extraordinary solely because of disability.

Criticism 
Criticisms of inspiration porn include that it "others" disabled people, that it portrays disability as a burden (as opposed to focusing on the societal obstacles that disabled people face), and that reducing disabled people to inspirations dehumanizes them, and makes them exceptionalist examples. Inspiration porn itself reinforces the stereotypes society has given disabled individuals that they are unable and less competent than those who do not have disabilities. After watching a 2016 advertisement titled We're the Superhumans from the Summer Paralympics in Rio de Janeiro, which showed a variety of disabled people accomplishing tasks in athletics, music, the household, and more alongside the repeated message of "Yes I can", a response group of disabled viewers felt it generally exploited disabled people for the pleasure and comfort of the non-disabled.

In 2014, disabled actress Amelia Cavallo described inspiration porn imagery as being "the visualization of disabled people overcoming what seem like broken and substandard bodies, sensory and cognitive make ups" to make "the non-disabled public feel good about their unbroken, able bodies, senses, and cognition." Forms of inspiration porn ostracize individuals and reduce their identity to be solely their disability. The focus on a single narrative, that disabled persons are always inspirational, contributes to a lack of accurate understandings of disability identities and to a widespread, unrealistic expectation of heroism for disabled people to live up to.

The Cripple punk movement, established in 2014, directly opposes the portrayal of disabled people as inspiration porn by refusing to conform to normative aesthetic and moral standards, not needing to be 'good' to deserve the conditional support of able-bodied people, and reclaiming the slang crip.

In popular culture 
The 2016 TV show Speechless explored the concept in an episode where it explains inspiration porn as "portrayal of people with disabilities as one-dimensional saints who only exist to warm the hearts and open the minds of able-bodied people."

The television show Loudermilk Season 3, Episode 7 "Wind Beneath My Wings" explores the issue as a regular character "Roger", played by Mat Fraser, who has thalidomide-induced phocomelia, struggles with receiving an award which he seems to receive for simply existing (and perhaps for playing drums) with his disability.

In the 2017 film Wonder, the main character Auggie, a child with a disability, is transitioned into public school. The film is centered on Auggie's "act as a one-man anti-bullying campaign—teaching his classmates, family members, and the viewers about acceptance" throughout his educational experience. The themes of the film, combined with the child actor not being disabled, led many to argue that films such as Wonder shape disability as being valuable only when meeting the emotional needs and conditions of other communities.

While the term was coined recently, inspiration porn in popular culture dates back centuries. According to author Nicole Markotić, Charles Dickens' A Christmas Carol (1843) uses character Tiny Tim to illustrate how "disability – in and of itself – transforms those who are otherwise ordinary into noble and dignified people."

Hilary Hughes of Entertainment Weekly criticized the album for the 2021 film Music, writing that the lyrical theme of "motivational language" flies "dangerously close to inspiration porn".

See also
 Birth lottery
 Disability in the media
 Poverty porn
 Rugged individualism
 Supercrip stereotype
 Survivorship bias

References

Further reading

Academic

Mainstream media

External links
 stellayoung.com (Archived)

Neologisms
Disability rights
Mass media issues